The Libyan National Army (LNA; , al-jaysh al-waṭaniyy al-Lībii) or the Libyan National Arab Army (LNAA; , al-jaysh al-waṭaniyy al-'Arabiyy al-Lībii) is a component of Libya's military forces which were nominally a unified national force under the command of Field Marshal Khalifa Haftar when he was nominated to the role on 2 March 2015 by the House of Representatives, consisting at the time of a ground force, an air force and a navy.

In 2014, LNA launched Operation Dignity, a military campaign against the General National Congress and armed militias and Islamist militant organizations. When the internationally recognised Government of National Accord (GNA) was established in Tripoli, part of the Libyan military forces were named the Libyan Army to contrast with the other part that retained the LNA identity. In the ongoing Civil War, the LNA is loyal to that part of the Libyan House of Representatives that meets in Tobruk, internationally recognised until October 2015. It fights against the Shura Council of Benghazi Revolutionaries, as well as Islamic State in Libya which is a common enemy for both LNA and the Libyan Army.

About half of the LNA consists of militias including Madkhali (Salafist) militias and Sudanese, Chadian and Russian mercenaries, which together constitute part of the LNA's effective forces. The LNA possesses its own air force. Most of the Libyan Navy is loyal to the GNA.

Interventions in the political system by the LNA include the late 2016 replacement of nine elected municipal councils out of a total of 27, replacing elected mayors by mostly military individuals and, according to witnesses cited by The Independent, the 17 July 2019 abduction of House of Representatives member Seham Sergiwa at her home in Benghazi by the 106th Brigade. The LNA stated that it was not responsible for the Sergiwa abduction.

Name 
In November 2019, the United Nations Panel of Experts on Libya established under United Nations Security Council Resolution 1973 started using the name Haftar Armed Forces (HAF) to replace the name Libyan National Army to refer to "all armed groups associated with Haftar". It also chose to use lower case regarding "brigades" and "battalions" in order to avoid giving them "the legitimacy of being a formed military unit of a government".

Allies 
Haftar and the LNA is de facto backed by the governments of Egypt, Israel and the United Arab Emirates.France has also provided tacit backing for Haftars forces. France carried out unprecedented air strikes by its Airforce on Chadian opposition fighters, which are LNA's biggest opponents. This resulted in a public dispute with Italy, which is supporting the Government of National Accord (GNA) in Tripolis.

Russia is Haftar's most committed ally. In May 2020 the US Africa Command (AFRICOM) stated that Russia had deployed at least 14 MiG Planes to the country. The plans where supported by private military contractors of Wagner Group and supporting the LNA.

Structure 
 ground forces
 regular forces
 Special Forces
 military intelligence
 militias
 foreign units
 LNA component of the Libyan Air Force
 naval forces: coastal patrol vessels

Ranks

Leadership 
Khalifa Haftar was made head of the armed forces of Libya on 2 March 2015, remaining as leader of the Libyan National Army after the split between the LNA and the Government of National Accord (GNA). , Major General Abdulrazek al-Nadoori was the chief of staff of the LNA. A lobbying firm was paid  to lobby on his behalf for 12 months, starting 1 December 2017, in Washington, D.C. Mahmoud al-Werfalli, known internationally for his International Criminal Court arrest warrant under Article 8(2)(c)(i) of the Rome Statute, was Axes Commander in the al-Saiqa unit of the LNA .

Other senior leaders include:
Commander-in-chief Aguila Saleh Issa (President of the Libyan House of Representatives).
Supreme commander Field Marshal Khalifa Haftar.
Chief of Staff of the Libyan Air Force Major General Saqr Geroushi.
 Military intelligence Major General Ramadan Atiat-Allah.
 Libyan Special Forces Major General Wanis Bukhamada. 
 Head of Operations Major General Abdulsalam al-Hasy.
 Official Spokesperson of the LNA Major General Ahmed al-Mesmary.
 Head of Darna operations room Major General Salim al-Rifady al-Obaidy.

Ground forces

Regular forces
, the LNA had about 7000 regular forces. These include:

106th Brigade 
In April 2019, the 106th Brigade, also known as Awlia Aldem was led by Khaled, son of Khalifa Haftar. , the brigade's commander was Salem Rahil.

On 17 July 2019, according to witnesses cited by The Independent and a family member cited by CNN, 25–30 masked, uniformed 106th Brigade members abducted member of the Libyan House of Representatives Seham Sergiwa in Benghazi. The LNA stated that it was not responsible for the abduction.
, after multiple calls by UNSMIL for the LNA to investigate the disappearance, Sergiwa remained missing.

73rd Brigade Mechanized infantry 
Leader: Saleh al-Quta'ani (Aug 2019)

Tareq ben Ziyad Brigade 
Leader: Omar Mraje' (Aug 2019)

9th Brigade 
Leader: Kani brothers; origin: Tarhuna (Aug 2019)

128th Battalion 
Leader: Hassan al-Zadma; many Mahamid members (Aug 2019)

116th Battalion 
Leader: Massoud Jiddu (Aug 2019)

124th Brigade 
Leader:

309th Brigade Mechanized infantry 
Leader:

1st Brigade 
Leader:

166th Brigade Mechanized infantry 
Leader:

188th Brigade infantry 
Leader:

5th Brigade infantry 
Leader:

115th Brigade Mechanized infantry 
Leader:

82nd Brigade infantry 
Leader:

Special forces
Al-Saiqa is an elite army unit, formed from a mixture of paratroopers and commandos. It numbers a few thousand and reports to the Ministry of Defence. It is popular in Benghazi, particularly in light of its opposition to Islamist Ansar al-Sharia group and because it is seen as a symbol of the reborn Libyan armed forces.

Militias
Madkhali militias in the LNA include the Tawhid Battalion commanded by Izz al-Din al-Tarhuni; the Tariq Ibn Ziyad Brigade, the Subul al-Salam group and the al-Wadi Brigade. LNA groups from Sabratha, Sorman, Tiji and Badr, towns in which Madkhali preachers were active and supported Haftar, are mostly Madkhali Salafists.

During the 2019–20 Western Libya campaign, the LNA was allied with the al-Kaniyat militia in Tarhuna.

Foreign mercenaries
Foreign mercenaries operating during 2019 Western Libya offensive on behalf of the LNA include Sudanese, Chadians and Russians.

Sudanese from the Sudan Liberation Movement/Army (Minnawi) were present in Libya starting in March 2015 and fought on behalf of the LNA in 2016. SLM (Minnawi) planned on leaving Libya in early 2017. Sudan Liberation Movement/Army (al-Nur) fighters fought on behalf of the LNA, with  personnel in Libya in mid-2016. Involvement of Sudanese mercenaries continued in 2018.
On 25 July 2019, 1000 members of the Sudanese Rapid Support Forces, widely attributed to be responsible for the 3 June 2019 Khartoum massacre, arrived in Libya and were expected to number 4000 in total.

Chadians from the Rally of Democratic Forces were recruited by the LNA in late 2015, especially in the southern part of Libya.

There were an estimated 200 Russian Wagner Group mercenaries in the LNA in 2019.

On 1 January 2022, the 5+5 Libyan Joint Military Commission announced the deportation of 300 Sudanese mercenaries linked to the LNA from the Eastern Region.

History

2011–2013
The Libyan National Army was founded in 2011 by the National Transitional Council, after forces aligned to it defeated the previous Libyan Army and overthrew Muammar Gaddafi's government. Supply depots and bases having been damaged during the civil war, the new army is faced with the challenge of having to rebuild much of the country's military infrastructure. Yousef Mangoush was named as its first Chief of Staff on 2 January 2012 and the force saw its first major deployment on 23 February, when it was deployed to Kufra to intervene in a tribal conflict.

In November 2011, the National Transitional Council began the difficult process of restructuring the army, with military personnel who defected from the Gaddafi government and former rebel fighters of the National Liberation Army forming the basis of the new Libyan Army. Major General Khalifa Belgacem Haftar was chosen as the overall commander of the new Libyan Army due to his military experience and loyalty to the revolution that overthrew Gaddafi.

The Libyan Army only numbered "a few thousand" trained soldiers in November 2011, and was rapidly trying to train up new fighters who could keep the peace nationwide and deter rogue militias from acting without NTC orders, and was responsible for brokering a ceasefire on at least one occasion in November between warring militas from Zawiya and Al Maya.

On 1 December 2011, it was reported that the National Liberation Army was to integrate up to 50,000 former rebel fighters into the new Libyan national army and police forces, with the aid of French training, with long-term aims to integrate as many as 200,000 fighters from the brigades that had fought against Gaddafi during the civil war.

In December 2011, Italy agreed to provide training to the Libyan Army as it attempted to reorganize in the aftermath of the Civil War.

Also in December, large numbers of former rebels were being given jobs in the new army, whilst the government also announced that they would be free to join the special forces and the Navy too. According to Osama al-Juwaili, the defence minister: "The idea is to inject new blood in the army which was marginalised by the tyrant (Gaddafi)"

General Yousef Mangoush said on 5 January 2012 that Libya's new army faces major obstacles such as rebuilding bases destroyed during the conflict, as well as disarming militias that were not part of the new army. National Army commander General Khalifa Haftar said later that it could take between three and five years for Libya to field a capable enough army to protect its borders.

On 7 May 2013, Libya's Defense Minister Mohammed al-Barghathi resigned due to a crisis caused by gunmen who have besieged two ministries for more than a week, a ministry official said. He later withdrew his resignation after Prime Minister Zeidan convinced him to stay.

Under an agreement reached at the Lough Erne G8 summit in June 2013, NATO countries the United Kingdom, Italy, Turkey, and the United States undertook to help train up to 15,000 personnel from Libyan National Army units over a two-year period. They were to take units from newly formed brigades for 10-week stints of intensive infantry training. The 27th Brigade was due to start at Bassingbourn in eastern England in January 2014. As a result of disorder and sexual assaults by some Libyan army cadets, the UK cancelled the programme in November 2014. The Libyan trainees were sent back to Libya, with the exception of five who were tried for sexual offenses.

2016 overthrow of mayors
In late 2016, Major-General Abdulrazek al-Nadoori of the LNA replaced several of the elected municipal mayors in eastern Libya by unelected people, mostly military. Altogether the LNA replaced nine elected councils, out of 27 in its area of control, by military administrators.

Equipment

Whilst it is known to a degree what equipment the Libyan National Army uses, the exact numbers of the below equipment currently in use is not known. What is certain is that a reasonable quantity of their equipment probably came from ransacked stocks of the original Libyan Army and from defectors as well. A significant amount of arms and equipment possessed by the LNA were majorly shipped by the United Arab Emirates and Russia. Having an airbase in Libya (Al-Khadim), the UAE constantly breached the UN arms embargo to transfer arms to the Haftar forces. An Emirati firm, Lancaster-6 was involved in transferring three Super Pumas to the LNA in June 2019. The helicopters were believed to be incapable to operate. The three helicopters remained inside hangars until Haftar's military parade in May 2021 and were expected to take part in his air force.

Technicals
A variety of pickup/utility vehicles, called technicals and gun trucks, often Toyota and other makers, armed with a variety of different weapons, including heavy machine guns, light MLRS' and anti-aircraft guns, most commonly used is the ZU-23-2 and the ZPU.

Tanks
  – T-34
   – T-55
  – T-62
  – T-72

Armoured personnel carriers
  – BTR-60
  – BRDM-2
  – BMP-1
  – BMP-3 – 10 delivered in 2013
  – Nimr – 169 in service
  – Panthera F9 – Received from UAE
  – Puma 4×4 – 20 donated by Italy
  – M1151 HMMWV – 200 donated by the U.S. Army

Artillery
  – BM-21 Grad – Multiple Rocket Launch System
  – LRSVM Morava
  – Type 63 multiple rocket launcher

Portable anti-tank weapons
  – Carl Gustav recoilless rifle
  – M40 recoilless rifle
  – FGM-148 Javelin
  – M79 Osa
  RPG-7 – In widespread use by all factions in the conflict.

Anti-tank guided missiles
  MILAN – From government stocks.
  – AT-3 "Malyutka" – From government stocks.
  – AT-4 "Fagot" – From government stocks.
  – AT-5 "Konkurs" – From government stocks.

Self-propelled anti-air gun
  – ZSU-23-4

UAVs 

  – CAIG Wing Loong, armed-drone

Small arms
  – AK-103 – assault rifle.
  – AR-M1 – assault rifle.
  – AK-47 – assault rifle
  – AKM – assault rifle.
  – AK-74 – assault rifle
  – RPK – light machine gun.
  – PK – machine gun.
  – DShK – heavy machine gun.

See also

National Liberation Army

Notes

References

 

Military of Libya
Second Libyan Civil War
Rebel groups in Libya